Martirano is a village and comune of the province of Catanzaro in the Calabria region of Italy.

History
Local historians believe that Martirano was built on the ruins of Mamertum, a city of the Roman Empire. Martirano, also known as Marturano, was seat of a bishop until 1818 when it became a titular bishopric.

Henry of Germany, eldest son of the Holy Roman Emperor Frederick II, died in Martirano in 1242.

See also
 Savuto river

Notes and references

Cities and towns in Calabria
Catholic titular sees